Al-Waleed border crossing (also spelled al-Walid), known in Syria as al-Tanf, is one of three official border crossings between Iraq and Syria. It is located in the Ar-Rutba District of the Al-Anbar Governorate in western Iraq, close to the northeasternmost point of Jordan in the Syrian Desert. It serves as the main border checkpoint on the highway between Damascus and Baghdad. The al-Tanf checkpoint is on the Syrian side of the border in the Homs Governorate. The Al-Waleed Palestinian refugee camp is nearby.

Syrian Civil War

In May 2015, the Islamic State of Iraq and the Levant (ISIL) militants captured the checkpoint, thus obtaining control over the full length of the Iraq–Syria border. In early August 2016, the Iraqi checkpoint was recaptured by pro-government Iraqi tribal militias backed by the U.S.-led forces. In August 2016, the BBC published photographs taken in June that year, which it said showed British special forces soldiers apparently guarding the perimeter of the New Syrian Army's base, at al-Tanf in Syria's Homs province.

In March 2017, U.S.-backed Maghawir a-Thawra rebels re-opened the border point, resuming cross-border civilian traffic; a group referred to as Jaish al-Ashair al-Iraqi was said to control the Iraqi side of the crossing. In April 2017, the U.S. "special forces" outpost at Al-Tanf was reported to be engaged in combat. On 18 May 2017, U.S.-led coalition fighter jets struck a convoy of pro-Syrian government forces advancing towards the Tanf base, where the U.S. military operated and trained anti-government rebels. The Syrian forces appeared to use advanced Russia-made arms and were supported by Russian helicopters, a report acknowledged on May 26 by the Russian Defence ministry's media outlet.

On 17 June 2017, the Iraqi military announced that the Iraqi army and Sunni tribal fighters, supported by U.S.-led coalition aircraft, had dislodged ISIL from the al-Waleed border crossing.

At the end of December 2017, the Chief of the Russian General Staff Valery Gerasimov said that the U.S. garrison at Al-Tanf was fully blocked by the Syrian government forces; he also claimed the U.S. was using the base as a training facility for ex-ISIL militants.

References

Populated places in Al Anbar Governorate
Iraq–Syria border crossings